Irina Donets (born 20 August 1976) is a volleyball player from the Netherlands.

Career 
She was a member of the Dutch National Women's Team.
She participated at the 2002 FIVB Volleyball Women's World Championship.

Clubs
1998 - 2001 AMVJ Amstelveen 
2001 - 2003 Teodora Ravenna

References

External links
 profile at CEV

1976 births
Living people
Dutch women's volleyball players
Middle blockers